Frank Crozier may refer to:

 Frank R. Crozier (1883–1948), Australian war artist
 Frank Percy Crozier (1879–1937), British military officer